Uakti may refer to:

Uakti (myth), a mythical musician described by the Tukano Indians of South America
Uakti (band), a Brazilian percussion quartet